Medovka is a rural locality (a village) in Novozhivotinnovskoye Rural Settlement, Ramonsky District, Voronezh Oblast, Russia. The population was 229 as of 2010. There are 40 streets.

Geography 
Medovka is located 22 km southwest of Ramon (the district's administrative centre) by road. Novozhivotinnoye is the nearest rural locality.

References 

Rural localities in Ramonsky District